The 2013 Beninese coup d'état attempt was a 2013 failed coup d'état that attempted to oust President Thomas Boni Yayi and install a military regime in Benin.

Background 
In February 2013, Colonel Pamphile Zomahoun and  businessman Johannes Dagnon blocked Yayi while returning from a trip from an African Union meeting at Equatorial Guinea. They were detained immediately.

While some argue that Yayi's government was being targeted because of its fight against corruption, others argue that he used the criminal justice system to silence opposition and media.

In the previous year, the president’s niece (another source says cousin), Patrice Talon who backed him in his 2006 presidential bid, his personal doctor and others were arrested for poisoning the president’s heart medication. They were pardoned.

References 

Politics of Benin